Klemens Hallmann (born 1976) is an Austrian entrepreneur and investor. He is founder and sole owner of Hallmann Corporate Group, one of the larger Austrian group of companies, specialized in sales, renovation and development of real estate projects, in addition to a wide-ranging portfolio of investments including finance and film production. With a net worth of more than 1.5 billion Euros, Hallmann was ranked number 32 on the 100 wealthiest Austrians list made by the renowned magazine "trend premium" in 2021.

Life 
Hallmann comes from a modest background in Vienna. Beginning at an early age, he started his business life working for various computer companies while still attending school. Finishing business college at the age of 17, he started his first business, importing and exporting computer components. Using the profits from this, he was able to make his first investment in real estate in 1996. One year later, he founded Hallmann Real Estate Company, which was the beginning of today's operation, Hallmann Holding International Investment Ltd. This company, of which Hallmann is the sole owner, is one of the largest private real estate development companies in Austria, owning a wide range of residential and commercial properties throughout the country. In addition, Hallmann Holding is a major shareholder in a wide range of other companies operating in areas such as investment banking, health research, film production and lifestyle. Since 2016 the Austrian magazin "trend" ranks Hallmann amongst the 100 wealthiest Austrians. In the following year Hallmann was among the top performers of the year and listed 12 positions higher. In 2018 he was ranked at number 43, in 2019 number 39.

At the end of 2018, Hallmann Holding acquired 100% of the Viennese property developer SÜBA AG, which has been active in affordable residential construction for over 35 years. The core business of the fast-growing SÜBA AG comprises services in the areas of planning, construction and sale of condominiums in Vienna and the surrounding area.

Hallmann is a key shareholder and supervisory board member of the international media group Pantaflix AG and its subsidiaries such as Pantaleon Films and Pantaflix Technologies. He also is a key shareholder and supervisory board member of the film production company Filmhouse Germany AG along with its subsidiaries, Summerstorm Entertainment and Egolli Tossel Film. Several movies produced by Filmhouse Germany and its subsidiaries, as well as their contributing actors, have received prestigious awards and nominations. In 2010 Helen Mirren and Christopher Plummer were nominated at the 82nd Academy Awards and the 67th Golden Globe Awards for their performance in the movie "The last station". The movie and its contributors were nominated an additional 15 times and received a total of 3 awards. In 2011 the TV miniseries "Carlos" was nominated 36 times and won 17 awards, amongst others at the 68th Golden Globe Award for "Best Miniseries or Motion Picture Made for Television". In 2014 the movie "Rush" was awarded 6 times and nominated 57 times. One of the major nominations was for the 71st Golden Globe Awards in the category "Best Motion Picture – Drama". In total, the movies that were realized by these three production companies, as well as the contributing actors' performances, were nominated over 210 times and won more than 70 international awards in the past decades.

Hallmann is also the founder and sole owner of the film and documentation production company Hallmann Entertainment Company GmbH.

Hallmann married the German model and actress Barbara Meier in Venice in June 2019. They have one daughter.

Sponsoring and social responsibility 
Since the 2015/2016 basketball season, Hallmann Holding has been the main and name sponsor of the BC Hallmann Vienna and the Hallmann Dome.With the BC Hallmann Vienna, Hallmann places a special emphasis on youth work. In addition to the professional squad, the Hallmann Dome also coaches youth and school teams. In total, over 500 children and young people learn not only to play basketball, but also important values such as mutual respect, fair play, discipline and team spirit. In Christmas and summer camps, the club organizes a unique sports program, which is even offered free of charge to committed pupils with good grades.

With its Hallmann Holding, Hallmann supports numerous social institutions as well as society-promoting projects: Hallmann Holding has been the main sponsor of the international climate conference R20 Austrian World Summit since 2018. Arnold Schwarzenegger's initiative brings together politicians, companies, representatives of civil society, start-ups, actors from regions and cities as well as experts in order to strengthen partnerships, exchange experiences and ideas and facilitate concrete, sustainable climate protection projects. Since 2019, Hallmann Holding has also been the main sponsor and presenter of the European Culture Prize TAURUS, which is awarded to individuals and institutions with visions and creativity who have successfully rendered outstanding services to cultural life in Europe.

Hallmann Holding also supports many different organizations such as the Austrian Red Cross, the Mirno More peace fleet, Licht ins Dunkel, Mission Hoffnung, the United Global Academy and Ronald McDonald Kinderhilfe.

Hallmann is a patron and collector of modern art and his collection includes works by Andy Warhol, Gerhard Richter, Damien Hirst and Gottfried Helnwein. He also supports national and international upcoming artists.

Business activities 
 Hallmann Holding International Investment Gmbh, Founder and CEO
 SAVE REAL ESTATE Vienna GmbH, Founder and CEO
 Devcon One Gmbh, Co-Founder and Joint CEO
 SÜBA Aktiengesellschaft, sole shareholder and head of the advisory board
 Lulalend, South Africa-based online lending platform, key shareholder
 JDC Group AG, key shareholder and member of the advisory board
MFC – Mikulik Finance Consulting, key shareholder
Hallmann Entertainment Company GmbH, Founder and CEO
PANTAFLIX AG, key shareholder and member of the advisory board
PANTALEON Films
PANTAFLIX Pictures
PANTAFLIX Technologies
March & Friends
PantaSounds
 Film House Germany AG, key shareholder and member of the advisory board
Summerstorm Entertainment
Egoli Tossell New Film GmbH

 40 additional Real Estate companies

Further positions 
 Member of the board of trustees of the European Culture Prize
Vice-President of the Austrian-United Arab Emirates Society
 Vice President of the Austrian basketball team BC Hallmann Vienna

Filmography 
2021: DreamScapes (producer)
2021: Breathtaking (TV documentary) (producer)
2021: Der Onkel – The Hawk (producer)
2021: Beer-tastic! 2 – Another round! (TV documentary) (producer)
2020: Beer-tastic! 2 – Another round! (TV documentary) (producer)
2020: Breathtaking (TV documentary) (producer)
2020: Deals and Visions (documentary) (producer)
2020: Takeover (executive producer)
2020: Endless (executive producer)
2020: Resistance (executive producer)
2019: N.O.C (executive producer)
2019: Auerhaus (executive producer)
2019: Dem Horizont so nah (executive producer)
2019: The Song of Names(executive producer)
2019: Abikalypse (executive producer)
2018: The Aspern Papers (executive producer)
 2018: Beer-tastic! (documentary) (producer)
 2018: Siberia (executive producer)
 2016: Deutschland. Made by Germany (executive producer)
 2016: The Exception (fka "The Kaiser's Last Kiss", executive producer)
 2015: Frankenstein (producer)
 2015: I Smile Back (co-producer)
 2015: 3 Türken und ein Baby (executive producer)
 2014: Coming In (executive producer)
 2014: Big Game (associate producer)
 2014: Hector and the Search for Happiness (film) (Executive Producer)
 2013: The Devil's Violinist (associate producer)

References

External links 
 www.hallmannholding.com
 

1976 births
Austrian real estate businesspeople
Living people
Businesspeople from Vienna
Austrian film producers